Aotearoa Legalise Cannabis Party (ALCP), also known as the Cannabis Party, is a political party in New Zealand. It is dedicated to removing or reducing restrictions on the use of cannabis and similar substances.

Party history

Cannabis in New Zealand 

Cannabis is the most widely used illegal drug in New Zealand. Its use today is regulated by the Misuse of Drugs Act 1975, which classes it as either a Class B drug ("Very high risk of harm") or a Class C drug ("moderate risk of harm"), depending on the product or substance. From December 2018, the Misuse of Drugs act was amended allowing for much broader use of medical marijuana, making the drug available to terminally ill patients in the last 12 months of life. Also in December 2018, the Government announced a non-binding referendum on cannabis for personal use, to be held as part of the 2020 general election, though the final result was against legalisation.

Party foundation and actions 
The Aotearoa Legalise Cannabis Party was founded on 30 May 1996, in Timaru. Michael Appleby led the party from 1996 until standing down in 2013. Currently the ALCP is co-led by Maki Herbert and Michael Appleby, with Steven Wilkinson as its president.

The ALCP has contested all eight general elections held since its founding, as well as all twelve by-elections. The party has never won representation in Parliament.

In 2008, the party invited Dunedin South MP David Benson-Pope to join the ALCP, but he declined, saying, "Their judgement has obviously been impaired by their recreational habits".

Policies 
The ALCP's policies all relate to cannabis, hemp, or drug education. These include legalising possession, growing and use of cannabis for those over 18, creating a 'medpot' card, taxing companies involved in the cannabis industry, removing the need for a licence to grow hemp, and funding drug education and research.

Members' success outside of ALCP 
Two ALCP candidates went on to become Members of Parliament for the Green Party. Nándor Tánczos and Metiria Turei were both ALCP candidates in 1996; Tánczos became a Green MP in 1999 and Turei became a Green MP in 2002. Another ALCP candidate, Tim Shadbolt, has been elected mayor in three places; prior to running for ALCP in 1996 he was mayor of Waitemata from 1983 to 1989 and mayor of Invercargill from 1993 to 1995, and afterwards he became the mayor of Invercargill from 1998 until 2022.

Former president and deputy leader Abe Gray founded Whakamana Cannabis Museum, New Zealand's first and only cannabis museum, and has been a high-profile cannabis activist and protester for decades.

Electoral results

General elections 

The ALCP has nominated candidates for electorate seats in each election. No ALCP candidate has ever won a seat.

The best general election result was in first election in 1996 where it won 1.66% of the party vote. It won 1.10% of the party vote in 1999, but since then the ALCP has not received more than 1% of the party vote in any election.

By-elections 

The ALCP has also contested all by-elections held since its founding. Its most successful result was in the 2004 Te Tai Hauauru by-election. Only the Māori Party, the ALCP, and independents contested this by-election. The ALCP candidate, Dun Mihaka, finished second behind Māori Party leader Tariana Turia, receiving 197 votes (2.52%) to Turia's 7,256 (92.74%).

See also

 Abe Gray
 Cannabis in New Zealand
 Cannabis political parties
 Drug policy reform
 Green Party of Aotearoa New Zealand
 2020 New Zealand cannabis referendum

References

External links

Official website
Facebook page
YouTube channel

Political parties established in 1996
1996 establishments in New Zealand
Political parties in New Zealand
Cannabis political parties
Cannabis law reform organizations based in New Zealand
Organisations based in Dunedin
1996 in cannabis
Cannabis in New Zealand